Do Androids Dream of Essential Beats? (also known by the title of a bootleg version, Big Brother Is Watching) is a mixtape released by British electronic group Unkle. It is an edited version of BBC Radio 1's Essential Mix show.

Track listing 
cd1 - 23 to 24 (67'17)
 "Intro" 0'13
 Rare Earth - "Get Ready" 2'03
 Unkle - "Lonely Soul" (UnkleSounds Edit) 6'38
 "Sounds Interlude #1" 0'32
 Giorgio Moroder - "Tears" 2'13
 DJ Shadow - "Organ Donor" 1'30
 DJ Shadow - "Organ Donor" (Extended Overhaul) 3'03
 DMX vs. Tears For Fears - "Who We Be" / "Shout" 5'21
 Queens Of The Stone Age - "Feel Good Hit Of The Summer" 3'11
 Unkle - "Safe In Mind" 8'36
 "Sounds Interlude #2" 0'46
 Kraftwerk vs. Whitney Houston - "Numbers" / "I Wanna Dance With Somebody" 4'34
 Howie B. - "Hey Jack" (Unkle Metamorphosis Mix) 7'33
 The Beatles - "Tomorrow Never Knows" (UnkleSounds Edit) 5'21
 Mercury Rev - "Holes" (Remix) 5'22
 Forme - "Percussive Thinking" 5'59
 Bushwacka! - "The Egyptian" 4'21

cd2 - 24 to 01 (50'19)
 NamTrak - "This Is What You Need" (Meat Katie Remix) 6'04
 Lee Burridge - "Found" 6'19
 Halo - "Dark Clouds" 5'33
 Kevin Swain & Clive Henry (Pitch Black) - "Underground Sound" 4'05
 Peace Division - "Seriously Twisted" 3'38
 Mode - "Ludovicos Technique" 4'37
 Radiohead - "Everything In Its Right Place" (UnkleSounds Edit) 5'38
 Layo & Bushwacka! - "Love Story" 5'10
 Fleetwood Mac - "The Chain" 2'55
 Leftfield vs. The Doors - "Phat Planet" / "The End" (UnkleSounds Edit) 4'18
 John Lennon - "Give Peace A Chance" 1'34
 "Outro" 0'28

2003 remix albums